Dar Badam (also Romanized as Dār Bādām; also known as Dār Bādām-e ‘Olyā) is a village in Gowavar Rural District, Govar District, Gilan-e Gharb County, Kermanshah Province, Iran. At the 2006 census, its population was 342, in 73 families.

References 

Populated places in Gilan-e Gharb County